CPBL recognizes save champions in the each season. The champions have been awarded from 1990. If players' holds is equal, the player whose ERA statistic better would be awarded.

Champions

External links

Chinese Professional Baseball League lists
Chinese Professional Baseball League awards